Fir Ol nEchmacht was the name of a group or race of people living in pre-historic Ireland. The name may be translated as "men of the race/people (possibly ?) of " ( being the given name of the people). Some scholars believe they are connected to, or the same as, the Nagnatae tribe, mentioned in Ptolemy's 2nd century AD work Geography.

Virtually all of Ireland west of the Shannon was once named after them and was called Cóiced Ol nEchmacht until the early historic era ( 5th-7th centuries).

It was only with the rise of the Connachta dynasty that the term Fir Ol nEchmacht was dropped and the province was renamed Connacht.

Sources

 Foras Feasa Eirann, Geoffrey Keating, 1636.
 Leabhar Mor nGenealach, Dubhaltach MacFhirbhisigh, 1649–1666.
 Ogyia, Ruaidhri O Flaithbheartaigh, 1684.
 The History of Mayo, T.H.Knox, 1908.

External links
 http://www.rootsweb.com/~irlkik/ihm/ire150.htm

Historical Celtic peoples
Connacht
Fir Bolg
Tribes of ancient Ireland